Garrison Golf & Curling Club is a golf and curling club, located within CFB Kingston in Kingston, Ontario, Canada.

Garrison is a private club, primarily for the use of Canadian Forces personnel and Canadian Department of National Defence employees, although civilians are also eligible to join.

The Curling Club was established in 1961 with four sheets of ice, which it has operated since that time. The Golf Club began in 1971 with the first nine holes, designed by Richard H. Green, the longtime professional at Cataraqui Golf and Country Club, and Johnny Marsh. The second nine holes of golf were opened in 1985, and were based on a design by Tom McBroom, who has since become one of Canada's leading golf course architects.

The golf course has been a frequent host of Ontario and Canadian championships for the Canadian Forces, as well as local, regional, and provincial events. Matt McQuillan, now a member of the Canadian Professional Golf Tour and a tour winner, learned the game at Garrison as a junior player in the 1990s. McQuillan earned 2011 PGA Tour playing privileges in December, 2010.

External links
Garrison Golf & Curling Club

Golf clubs and courses in Ontario
Curling clubs in Canada
Sports venues in Kingston, Ontario
1961 establishments in Ontario